The 3000 and 5000 metres distances for women in the 2011–12 ISU Speed Skating World Cup were contested over six races on six occasions, out of a total of seven World Cup occasions for the season, with the first occasion taking place in Chelyabinsk, Russia, on 18–20 November 2011, and the final occasion taking place in Berlin, Germany, on 9–11 March 2012.

Martina Sáblíková of the Czech Republic successfully defended her title from the previous season by winning all races, while Stephanie Beckert of Germany came second, and Claudia Pechstein, also of Germany, came third.

Top three

Race medallists

Standings 
Standings as of 11 March 2012 (end of the season).

References 

Women 3000
ISU